Juano G. "Juano" Hernández (July 19, 1896 – July 17, 1970) was a Puerto Rican stage and film actor who was a pioneer in the African American film industry. He made his silent picture debut in The Life of General Villa, and talking picture debut in an Oscar Micheaux film, The Girl from Chicago, which was directed at black audiences. Hernández also performed in a series of dramatic roles in mainstream Hollywood movies. His participation in the film Intruder in the Dust (1949) earned him a Golden Globe Award nomination for "New Star of the Year."  Later in life he returned to Puerto Rico, where he intended to make a film based on the life of Sixto Escobar.

Early years
Hernández was born in San Juan, Puerto Rico to Puerto Rican parents, Jose Guillermo and Clara de Ponce. With no formal education, he worked as a sailor and settled in Rio de Janeiro. He was hired by a circus and became an entertainer, making his first appearance as an acrobat in Rio de Janeiro in 1922. He later lived in the Caribbean and made his living as a professional boxer, fighting under the name Kid Curley.

Vaudeville and the stage
In New York City, he worked in vaudeville and minstrel shows, sang in a church choir and was a radio script writer. During his spare time he perfected his diction by studying Shakespeare, thus enabling himself to work in radio. He co-starred in radio's first all-black soap opera We Love and Learn.  He also participated in the following radio shows: Mandrake the Magician (opposite Raymond Edward Johnson and Jessica Tandy), The Shadow, Tennessee Jed, and Against the Storm. He became a household name after his participation in The Cavalcade of America, a series which promoted American history and inventiveness. He appeared in the Broadway shows Strange Fruit and Set My People Free.  His Broadway  debut was in the chorus of the 1927 musical production Show Boat.

Film career

Hernández appeared in 26 films throughout his career. He portrayed a revolutionary soldier in the silent film The Life of General Villa, and his first "talkie" films were small roles in films produced by Oscar Micheaux, who made race films for black audiences. His talking film debut was Micheaux's The Girl from Chicago (1932), in which he was cast as a Cuban racketeer. He also has a speaking part, although uncredited, as a police officer in the 1932 crime drama and musical Harlem Is Heaven, which stars Bill "Bojangles" Robinson.

In 1949, he acted in his first mainstream film, based on William Faulkner's novel, Intruder in the Dust, in which he played the role of Lucas Beauchamp, a poor Mississippi farmer unjustly accused of the murder of a white man. The film earned him a Golden Globe nomination for "New Star of the Year". The film was listed as one of the ten best of the year by the New York Times. Faulkner said of the film: "I'm not much of a moviegoer, but I did see that one. I thought it was a fine job. That Juano Hernández is a fine actor--and man, too."

In the 1950 western Stars In My Crown, directed by Jacques Tourneur, starring Joel McCrea, Hernández plays a freed slave who refuses to sell his land and faces an angry lynch mob.

He was singled out for praise for his performance in the 1950 film The Breaking Point with John Garfield. The New York Times called his performance "quietly magnificent."

He also received favorable notices for his performances in Trial (1955), about a politically charged court case, in which he played the judge, and Sidney Lumet's The Pawnbroker (1965).

More than 50 years after its initial release, in 2001, film historian Donald Bogle wrote that Intruder in the Dust broke new ground in the cinematic portrayal of blacks, and Hernández's "performance and extraordinary presence still rank above that of almost any other black actor to appear in an American movie."

Television appearances
Over the years, Hernández made guest appearances on a dozen U.S. network television programs, appearing three times in 1960 and 1961 on the ABC series,  Adventures in Paradise, starring Gardner McKay. In 1959, he starred in the Alfred Hitchcock Presents production of the Ambrose Bierce short story An Occurrence at Owl Creek Bridge.

Other television shows in which Hernandez appeared were Naked City, The Defenders, The Dick Powell Show and Studio One.

Later years
Hernández returned to Puerto Rico late in his life. Together with Julio Torregrosa he wrote a script for a movie about the life of Puerto Rico's first boxing champion, Sixto Escobar. He was unable to get funding in Puerto Rico and therefore he translated the script into English. He sent it to several companies in Hollywood and had it almost sold at the time of his death. In the last two years of his life he appeared in three films, The Extraordinary Seaman (1969) with David Niven, The Reivers (1969) with Steve McQueen, and They Call Me Mister Tibbs! (1970) with Sidney Poitier.

He died in San Juan on July 17, 1970, of a cerebral hemorrhage 2 days before his 74th birthday, and was interred at Cementerio Buxeda Memorial Park, Trujillo Alto, Puerto Rico.

Filmography

 The Life of General Villa (1914) ... Revolutionary Soldier (uncredited)
 The Girl from Chicago (1932) .... Gomez
 Harlem Is Heaven (1932) .... Cop (uncredited)
 Lying Lips (1939) .... Rev. Bryson
 The Notorious Elinor Lee (1940) ... John Arthur
 Intruder in the Dust (1949) .... Lucas Beauchamp
 Young Man with a Horn (1950) .... Art Hazzard
 Stars in My Crown (1950) .... Uncle Famous Prill
 The Breaking Point (1950) .... Wesley Park
 Kiss Me Deadly (1955) .... Eddie Yeager
 Trial (1955) .... Judge Theodore Motley
 Ransom! (1956) .... Jesse Chapman aka Uncle Jesse
 Something of Value (1957) .... Njogu, Oath Giver
 The Mark of the Hawk (1958) .... Amugu
 St. Louis Blues (1958) .... Rev. Charles Handy
 Machete (1958) .... Bernardo
 Sergeant Rutledge (1960) .... Sgt. Matthew Luke Skidmore
 The Sins of Rachel Cade (1961) .... Kalanumu
 Two Loves (1961) .... Chief Rauhuia
 Westinghouse Presents: The Dispossessed (1961) (TV) .... Standing Bear
 Hemingway's Adventures of a Young Man (1962) .... Bugs
 The Pawnbroker (1964) .... Mr. Smith
 The Extraordinary Seaman (1969) .... Ali Shar
 The Reivers (1969) .... Uncle Possum
 They Call Me Mister Tibbs! (1970) .... Mealie Williamson (final film role)

See also
 List of Puerto Ricans
 African immigration to Puerto Rico
 List of Puerto Ricans of African descent

References

External links

 
 
 
 
 Juano Hernandez in Hollywood Cinema at Centro Voices

1896 births
1970 deaths
20th-century American male actors
Male actors from San Juan, Puerto Rico
Male actors from Los Angeles
Puerto Rican male actors
Puerto Rican people of Brazilian descent
Puerto Rican radio actors
Vaudeville performers